Ahmad Amir Kamdar (born 5 January 1989) is an Iranian footballer who currently plays for Naft Tehran in the Persian Gulf Pro League.

Club career

Mes Kerman
Amir Kamdarhas became a part of Pas Academy in 2008. He was promoted to the first team in winter 2008 with a 2-year contract.

Moghavemat Tehran
In 2010–11 season, he joined Moghavemat Tehran for two seasons to end his conscription career.

Gostaresh Foolad
He joined Gostaresh in summer 2012. He made his debut for Zob Ahan in the first fixture of 2012–13 Azadegan League as a midfielder. He scored his first goal for the club in the 15th week in the 2013–14 Iran Pro League against Foolad.

Zob Ahan
In the winter of 2016 Ahmad signed an 18-month contract with Iran Pro League side Zob Ahan.

Club career statistics

Honours

Club
Tractor Sazi
Iran Pro League Runner-up: 2014–15

Zob Ahan
Hazfi Cup: 2015–16

References

External links
Persian League Profile

1989 births
Living people
Iranian footballers
Sanat Mes Kerman F.C. players
Gostaresh Foulad F.C. players
Tractor S.C. players
Siah Jamegan players
Zob Ahan Esfahan F.C. players
Iran under-20 international footballers
Sportspeople from Tabriz
Association football midfielders